The Pepsi-Cola Playhouse is an American dramatic anthology series that aired on ABC from 1953 to 1955, sponsored by Pepsi-Cola. The show was hosted by Arlene Dahl (1953), Anita Colby (1954), and, finally, Polly Bergen (1955). Initially the series was done live, but switched to film during the first season.

Guest stars
 Claude Akins
 Frances Bavier
 Whit Bissell
 Charles Bronson
 Sally Brophy
 Jean Byron
 Pat Carroll
 Bobby Clark
 Andy Clyde
 Lloyd Corrigan
 Walter Coy
 Ross Elliott
 Beverly Garland
 Nancy Gates
 Peter Graves
 Rick Jason
 Carolyn Jones
 Brian Keith
 Jack Kelly
 Barton MacLane
 Lee Marvin
 Vera Miles
 Dennis Morgan
 George Nader
 Jay Novello
 Patrick O'Neal
 Frances Rafferty
 Karen Sharpe
 Craig Stevens
 Onslow Stevens

Episode status
The UCLA Film and Television Archive has three episodes of the series in its collection.

References

External links

The Pepsi-Cola Playhouse at CVTA with episode list

1953 American television series debuts
1955 American television series endings
1950s American anthology television series
American Broadcasting Company original programming
Black-and-white American television shows
English-language television shows
Television series by Universal Television
American live television series